António Manuel Mascarenhas Gomes Monteiro (16 February 1944 – 16 September 2016) was the first democratically elected President of Cape Verde from 22 March 1991 to 22 March 2001.

Early life and education 
Born in Ribeira da Barca in 1944, Monteiro went to university in Belgium and graduated with his law degree from the Catholic University of Leuven.

Political career 
During the PAICV's single-party government, Monteiro served in various high level positions. He was the Secretary-General of the National Assembly from 1977 to 1980 and President of the Supreme Court of Justice from 1980 to 1990.

Presidency of Cape Verde
Affiliated with the Movement for Democracy, he was the first president elected in a multi-party election in the country, defeating Aristides Pereira in the February 1991 presidential election.

In February 1995, he awarded one of the archipelago's greatest writer during the colonial era Eugénio Tavares the Medal of the Ordem do Vulcão.

He was re-elected without opposition in 1996, receiving 80% of the vote. After serving two five year terms, he stepped down in 2001; in the 2001 election, Movement for Democracy candidate Carlos Veiga, who had served as Prime Minister under Monteiro, was defeated by Pedro Pires of the African Party for the Independence of Cape Verde (PAICV).

East Timor controversy
On 19 September 2006, it was announced that Monteiro would succeed Sukehiro Hasegawa as head of the United Nations mission in East Timor.   The appointment was criticized in East Timor, partly because Monteiro had a poor knowledge of English.   It was reported that Timorese president Xanana Gusmão was among those who expressed their concern about the appointment.

On 25 September, Monteiro announced that he had changed his mind and would not be accepting the position.  He told journalists that "I told the Deputy Secretary-General that I already knew that there were reservations about my name on the part of parties engaged in East Timor and that I was no longer interested in serving there."  He explained that "the functions of a representative of the UN Secretary-General in East Timor are very broad and must be exercised with the goodwill of all parties involved."  Therefore, "it is better to stand down now than to create problems later on, especially in view of the complexity of the situation in East Timor."

Memberships and awards

Honors

Global Leadership Foundation
Monteiro was a Member of the Global Leadership Foundation, an organization which works to support democratic leadership, prevent and resolve conflict through mediation and promote good governance in the form of democratic institutions, open markets, human rights and the rule of law. It does so by making available, discreetly and in confidence, the experience of former leaders to today's national leaders. It is a not-for-profit organization composed of former heads of government, senior governmental and international organization officials who work closely with Heads of Government on governance-related issues of concern to them.

Personal life
Monteiro's wife, Antonina Mascarenhas Monteiro, known widely as Tuna Mascarenhas, the former First Lady of Cape Verde, died in Praia on September 9, 2009, at the age of 65. He had three children, Marisa, Gamal and Liliana.

Monteiro died on September 16, 2016, at the age of 72, from kidney cancer and was buried in the cemetery in the city of Assomada on September 18.

References

1944 births
2016 deaths
Presidents of Cape Verde
Government of East Timor
Movement for Democracy (Cape Verde) politicians
People from Santa Catarina, Cape Verde
Cape Verdean expatriates in Belgium
Recipients of orders, decorations, and medals of Senegal